USS Marine Phoenix (T-AP-195) was a  that saw service with the US Navy for the task of transporting troops to and from combat areas. She was of the C4-S-A3  design type.

Construction
Marine Phoenix, approved 18 April 1944, was laid down by Kaiser Shipbuilding Co., Vancouver, Washington, 16 December 1944, as MC Hull no. 2365; launched 9 August 1945; sponsored by Mrs. Thomas M. Robins; and delivered to her operator, Moore-McCormack Lines, 9 November 1945.

Service history
The ship operated as a War Shipping Administration (WSA) troop transport from 27 October 1945 delivery until 1946. On 12 December 1945 Marine Phoenix departed Seattle, Washington with occupation troops for Nagoya Japan. There she embarked homeward‑bound veterans of the Pacific campaigns and departed for Seattle 4 January arriving 16 January 1946. After voyage repairs During the next five months she continued trooplift runs out of Seattle, to Japan, Korea, China, the Marianas, and the Hawaiian Islands. In 1947, she entered the Maritime Commission Reserve Fleet at Suisun Bay, California, where she remained for 3 years.

Following the invasion of South Korea by North Korean Communists, Marine Phoenix was acquired by the US Navy from the Maritime Commission 21 July 1950; placed in service August 1950; and assigned to duty with Military Sea Transportation Service (MSTS). Crewed by the civil service, she began trooplifts to the Far East later in August, and reached Korean waters 2 September. During the next 3 years she bolstered the free world's stand to repel Communist aggression in Korea, and completed 19 round trips to the western Pacific and back. Operating out of Seattle and San Francisco, she carried troops and supplies to Japanese and Korean ports including Sasebo, Yokohama, Pusan, and Inchon. In addition during February 1952, she shuttled troops to Kojedo Island in response to mounting unrest among POW-s through Communist agitators. Following the uneasy armistice which ended hostilities in Korea, she returned veterans to the United States. After reaching Seattle, from Inchon, 5 December 1953, she was placed in reduced operational status until 30 April 1954.
 
Marine Phoenix, then resumed transport service in the Far East, and during the remainder of the year she made six runs to the western Pacific out of west coast ports including Seattle and San Diego. Returning to Seattle, 3 January 1955, she resumed reduced operational status until 4 December; she sailed for South Korea, 9 December. She reached Inchon, 27 December; shuttled troops to Japan and Okinawa; and, from 3 to 19 January 1956, steamed to the west coast. Between 30 January and 14 March, she completed one more round trip to the Far East; then was again in reduced status at Seattle.

Fate
On 3 November 1958, she arrived Astoria, Oregon, where she transferred to the Maritime Administration and was placed with the National Defense Reserve Fleet in the Columbia River Group. Her name was struck from the Navy list the same day. Marine Phoenix was sold to Mohawk Shipping Inc., 25 April 1967, converted to a general cargo ship and renamed Mohawk. In 1979, Mohawk was sold for scrapping in Taiwan.

Awards
Marine Phoenix received eight battle stars for Korean service.

References

Bibliography 
Online resources

External links
 NavSource Online: Photo Archive - USNS Marine Phoenix (T-AP-195)

 

Troop ships of the United States
Ships built in Vancouver, Washington
1945 ships
Astoria Reserve Fleet
Suisun Bay Reserve Fleet